Highflyer (1774 – 18 October 1793) was an undefeated Thoroughbred racehorse and a very successful sire of the 18th century.

Breeding
Bred by Sir Charles Bunbury, the fifth Baronet, the colt was foaled at Great Barton, in 1774. Highflyer's sire was the important Herod, one of the foundation stallions for the classic Thoroughbred, and himself an excellent racehorse and stud, producing Florizel (b.c. 1768) and Woodpecker (ch.c. 1773). His dam, Rachel (1763) was by Blank, and out of a mare by Regulus, both stallions by the Godolphin Arabian, making Rachel inbred 2x3 to the great stallion. Blank also sired Pacolet (1763). Highflyer was a half-brother to Mark Anthony (b c 1767 Spectator) who sired The Derby winner Aimwell.

Conformation
Highflyer was a bay stallion with a sock on a hind pastern. The Arabian influence could still be seen in him, having a light overall build, with a small, refined, slightly dished head, an arched neck, short back, relatively flat croup, and high-set tail. His abilities on the track could have been foreseen in his very muscular hindquarters, sloping shoulder, and deep barrel.

Racing career
Highflyer began his racing career at a time when the trend was shifting from starting Thoroughbreds at the track at age five, to instead begin racing them at a younger age. His maiden race was in October, in a two-mile event for three-year-olds at Newmarket, which he won. He returned to Newmarket the following year, beating out the four-year-olds in both the July and October meet, before winning an open stakes, as well as a match against the Matchem son, Dictator.

In 1779, he won an additional two races before Lord Bolingbroke accepted an offer from Richard Tattersall, who bought the colt for 2,500 pounds. Highflyer continued to race, winning with a walk over at Nottingham and in York at the Great Subscription Stakes. He then won the Great Subscription Stakes for a second time, before winning the King's Purse at Lichfield. He finished his racing career undefeated in 14 race starts.

Stud record
Tattersall's grand plan for Highflyer was built to make him rich, and it certainly accomplished its task. It rested on two main points. First, Tattersall would breed Highflyer to as many mares as possible, bringing in income from the stud fee (a practice for which he was criticised, as many thought he was over-breeding the animal and later pointed to Highflyer's death at 19 to be proof of that fact). To help accomplish this, he stood his stallion at his Red Barns farm for the initial fee of 15 guineas, eventually raising the fee to 50 guineas. His second tactic was to buy up as many daughters of Eclipse as he could, breed them to Highflyer, and sell them on in-foal. This combined the blood of Herod and Eclipse to produce some excellent racehorses who would form the basis of the modern Thoroughbred. Estimates have found that Tattersall made at least 15,000 pounds each year off of Highflyer breedings, from which he built a mansion at aptly named it Highflyer Hall.

However, Tattersall was quick to credit the stallion with his financial success. When Highflyer died on 18 October 1793, he was buried in his paddock, and his owner gave the great horse the epitaph: "Here lieth the perfect and beautiful symmetry of the much lamented Highflyer, by whom and his wonderful offspring the celebrated Tattersall acquired a noble fortune, but was not ashamed to acknowledge it."

Highflyer was the Leading Sire for 15 years (1785–1796, 1798), during which time he produced 469 winners, including three Derby winners, three St. Leger winners, and an Epsom Oaks winner.

 Delpini: 1781 grey colt, out of a Blank mare (he was 3x2 inbred to Blank). His best get included two Oaks winners (Scotia and Theophania), a St. Leger winner (Symmetry), the stallions Evander, Seymour, and Timothy, and the daughter Zara.
 Diamond: 1792 brown colt, out of a Matchem daughter, his many wins included the 1796 Jockey Club Stakes, Newcastle's King's Plate, the King's Plate at Newmarket First October and King's Plate at Newmarket First Spring, the four-mile Oxford Cup, the King's Plate at Nottingham, a 1,000 guineas match against Shuttle, and the Jockey Club Plate at Newmarket. He also finished second in the two-mile Great Produce Stakes at York, fourth in the Derby.
 Eliza: 1791 bay filly, out of an Eclipse mare, won the Town Plate (Newmarket), a Produce Stakes (York), the four-mile Richmond Cup, 2nd in the Oaks and in the Craven Stakes (Newmarket), third in the four-mile Doncaster Cup and Doncaster Stakes. Produced Scud (Doncaster winner, sired two Derby and one Oaks winners) and the dam to Consul (winner of the Doncaster Cup).
 Escape: sired the mare Flight, who was second dam of both Birdcatcher and Faugh-a-Ballagh.
 Grey Highflyer: 1782 grey filly, out of a Matchem mare (1), was the dam of Hambletonian.
 Huncamunca: 1787 brown filly, produced Champion (won the Derby and St. Leger), second dam of the Oaks winners, Maid of Orleans and Charlotte, and third-dam of Mameluke (Derby winner)
 Maria: 1791 bay filly, dam to Champignon (winner of the Ascot Gold Cup)
 Noble: 1783 bay colt, won the 1786 Epsom Derby
 Omphale: 1781 bay mare, won the 1784 St. Leger
 Prunella: 1788 bay filly, out of a Snap mare, dam of Derby-winner Waxy Pope (by Waxy), Oaks winner Pelisse (by Whiskey), and Penelope (by Trumpator)
 Rockingham: 1781 bay colt, out of a Matchem daughter, produced Castianira (dam of the American sire Sir Archy (by Diomed)
 Sir Peter Teazle: 1784 brown colt, out of a Snap mare, was his best son. He won 16 races during his life, including the Derby in 1787. He then followed the way of Highflyer, becoming Leading Sire for several years (1799–1802, 1804–1809), and siring five Derby winners, four St. Leger winners, and two Oaks winners, as well as many other very important colts and fillies who had a lasting impact on the breed.
 Skyscraper: 1786 bay colt, won the 1789 Epsom Derby
 Spadille: won the 1787 St. Leger
 Traveller: 1785 bay colt, a good racehorse winning the four-mile Stand Plate, the Great Subscription Purse at York, and matches against Grey Diomed and Meteor (by Eclipse).
 Volante: won the 1792 Oaks
 Unknown "Eagle's Dam": 1785 bay filly, produced Spread Eagle and Didelot (both won the Derby), and the sire Eagle who was imported to the US.
 Young Flora: won the 1788 St. Leger

Other sons of Highflyer include Pharamond, Slope, Walnut, Sour-Crout, and St. George. His daughters also became the dams of Meteora, Coelia, N.M.B.O., Dick Andrews, Orville, Paulowitz, Cervantes, Sancho, Oscar, and Bedford. The Highflyer-Eclipse combination produced Skyscraper, Lambinos, St. George, Volante, and Oberon.

Pedigree

Note: b. = Bay, blk. = Black, br. = Brown, ch. = Chestnut

Sire line tree

Highflyer
Pharamond
Slope
Sour-Crout
Delpini
Timothy
Symmetry
Seymour
Moses
Rockingham
Noble
Sheet Anchor
Sir Peter Teazle
Agonistes
Barbarossa
Expectation
Knowlsey
Pipylin
Robin Redbreast
Trafalgar
Young Sir Peter Teazle
Ambrosio
Old England
Brown Bread
Rasping
Stamford
Viscount
Sir Harry
Sir Alfred
Sir Hal
Moses
Archduke
Roseden
Sir Solomon
Haphazard
Don Cossack
X Y Z
Filho da Puta
Dr Faustus
Hedgeford
Birmingham
Colwick
Antar
Reginald
Figaro
Walton
Phantom
Cedric
Pindarrie
Enamel
Middleton
Vandyke Junior
The Flyer
Rainbow
Hercule
Franck
Partisan
Godolphin
Mameluke
Patron
Glaucus
Gladiator
Venison
Nectar
Waterloo
Arbutus
St. Patrick
St. Francis
Ditto
Luzborough
Picton
Sir Oliver
Doge of Venice
Olive
Caleb Quot'em
Sir Paul
Otho
Paulowitz
King Cole
Little Boy Blue
Paul Pry
Cain
Sharpshooter
Changeling
Archibald
Ernest
Fyldener
Buffalo
Bramshill
Tozer
Paris
Cardinal York
Advance
Pioneer
Petronius
Spadille
Dion
Quatorze
Vole
Manilla
Spindleshanks
Escape
Emigrant
Traveller
Skyscraper
Skyrocket
Walnut
Ashton
St. George
Pan
Oberon
Moorcock
Ptarmigan
Heathpoult
Plunder
Diamond

See also
 List of leading Thoroughbred racehorses

References

External links

Thoroughbred Heritage: Highflyer

1774 racehorse births
1793 racehorse deaths
Thoroughbred family 13
Racehorses bred in the Kingdom of Great Britain
Racehorses trained in the Kingdom of Great Britain
Undefeated racehorses
Byerley Turk sire line